Eric Aguirre also known as Vice (born 13 October 1978) is an American DJ. He is signed to Creative Artists Agency.

Early life
Born in Los Angeles, California, Vice discovered his passion for spinning records at the age of 12, when he bought his first turntables.

Career

DJing
Vice has the ability to switch between different types of music genres. He is known to perform on stage at some of the hottest clubs across the country for sold-out audiences in major cities. Inspired by his many travels, Vice's music has the distinct ability to take listeners around the world to places such as Ibiza, Tokyo, London and Hong Kong, like he did with his hit song World Is My Playground. Whether it's a fast-paced EDM song or a relaxing poolside beat, there's a hint of adventure in every song that takes listeners to the various places that Vice has been to. His list of residences includes Marquee (Las Vegas and New York City), Liv Miami, and Create in Los Angeles, in addition to performances at Coachella, Nocturnal Wonderland, Electric Daisy Carnival and Ultra Miami. Vice collaborates with a wide variety of artists, ranging from A-list to indie. He's worked with everyone from Rihanna, Kelly Rowland, Capital Cities, Linkin Park to Tegan & Sara.

In April 2016, Vice was featured on fellow DJ Diplo's BBC Radio 1 show Diplo & Friends. In October 2018, Vice joined "97.1 Amp Radio" KAMP-FM in Los Angeles as host of an afternoon mixshow.

CRSVR
Vice combined his passion for music along with his love of sneakers by setting up in-store DJ booths in the CRSVR Boutiques that he owns in California and Las Vegas, creating a unique retail experience.

Personal life
Vice currently lives in Los Angeles, California and is married.

Electric Taco
Electric Taco is a monthly series that launched January 2016 and features Vice in a Tesla with notable celebrities such as Reggie Bush, A-Trak and Nick Young from the Los Angeles Lakers.

Singles
On September 30, 2016 Vice released an interpolation of Anna Graceman's original song "Treble Heart". The new interpolation was called "Steady 1234", featuring YouTube songstress Jasmine Thompson and rapper Skizzy Mars. The track has amassed great success among millennials within the Spotify, YouTube and musical.ly platforms. The single was certified gold in Finland and was crowned winner of the Next Wave November challenge on musical.ly.

Coming off the success of "Steady 1234" Vice released "Obsession" with pop sensation Jon Bellion on March 10, 2017.

On August 11, 2017 he released a version of "Obsession" with rapper KYLE titled Obsession (25/7).

On October 23, 2018, he released "Make Up" with Jason Derulo, featuring Ava Max.

References

American DJs
American male musicians
1978 births
Living people
Musicians from Los Angeles
Sirius XM Radio programs